The National Water Research Institute (NWRI) is a 501(c)(3) nonprofit organization,  located in California, was  founded in 1991. It is devoted to promoting the protection, maintenance, and restoration of water supplies through collaborative research and outreach activities.  It is governed by a Board of Directors consisting of representatives of water and wastewater agencies/districts in Southern California.

NWRI serves as a major  source of water-science research funding in the United States, focusing efforts on issues in drinking water, wastewater, water resources, and water reuse.  NWRI also provide knowledge and training in these areas through publications, workshops, and conferences.

Funding
NWRI's core funding comes from the Joan Irvine Smith & Athalie R. Clarke Foundation, supplemented by   funds from joint-venture partners:  local, state, and federal governments, as well as from private industry, public utilities, and universities. NWRI also receives funding from its member agencies; representatives from each of NWRI's member agencies serve on NWRI's Board of Directors.

Member agencies
Inland Empire Utilities Agency
Irvine Ranch Water District
Los Angeles Department of Water and Power
Orange County Sanitation District
Orange County Water District
West Basin Municipal Water District

Activities
The Institute conducts research that reflects the broader and emerging roles water resources plays in complex urban environments, in the areas of
Treatment and monitoring
Water quality assessment
Knowledge management
Exploratory research

The Institute awards Fellowships to support master's or doctoral graduate research related to water

The Institute also awards the Athalie Richardson Irvine Clarke Prize, established in 1993, to honor outstanding individuals who have implemented better water science research and technology.  The Prize—a gold medallion and $50,000 award—is presented every summer; the Clarke Prize recipient delivers the annual Clarke Lecture.

Personnel
The directors of NWRI have been Ronald B. Linsky, from 1991–2005, and Jeffrey J. Mosher, from 2005–2017. Kevin Hardy succeeded Jeff Mosher in April 2017.

See also
Clarke Prize

External links
Organization web site
Clarke Prize

Water and the environment